Shorea macrobalanos (called, along with some other species in the genus Shorea, yellow meranti) is a species of plant in the family Dipterocarpaceae. It is a tree endemic to Borneo.

References

macrobalanos
Endemic flora of Borneo
Trees of Borneo
Critically endangered plants
Taxonomy articles created by Polbot